Phanerozoic I: Palaeozoic is the eighth studio album by German progressive metal band The Ocean. It is a concept album exploring the Phanerozoic geological eon, with each track title referencing a period of the Paleozoic era. Phanerozoic I: Palaeozoic was released worldwide on 2 November 2018. It is the first of two volumes; the latter,  Phanerozoic II: Mesozoic / Cenozoic, was released separately in 2020.

Reception 

The album was released to critical acclaim. "Devonian: Nascent" was selected by Loudwire as one of the top metal songs of 2018; Jonas Renkse's guest vocals on this track were praised specifically by several reviewers.

Track listing

Charts

References 

2018 albums
The Ocean (band) albums